José Enger Veras Romero (born October 20, 1980) is a Dominican former professional baseball relief pitcher. He was signed by the Tampa Bay Devil Rays organization in 1998. He made his Major League Baseball (MLB) debut in 2006 with the New York Yankees. He also played for the Cleveland Indians, Florida Marlins, Pittsburgh Pirates, Milwaukee Brewers, Detroit Tigers, Chicago Cubs and Houston Astros.

Playing career

Minor leagues
Veras was signed as an undrafted free agent by the Tampa Bay Devil Rays in 1998.  He rose through the Tampa Bay minor league system, mostly as a starter.  Veras struggled when he reached AAA, and was converted to a relief pitcher.  He was released after the 2004 season. He pitched for the Texas Rangers AAA affiliate, the Oklahoma RedHawks, in 2005.

New York Yankees

Veras signed with the New York Yankees before the 2006 season, which he spent most of in AAA, though he also made his MLB debut, pitching 11 innings with a 4.09 earned run average (ERA).  Veras was injured early in 2007, but rehabbed and returned to MLB as a September call up. After being called up to the majors early in the 2008 season, he emerged as a dominant force out of the bullpen and became the setup reliever after the Yankees traded Kyle Farnsworth. Veras was designated for assignment by the Yankees on June 16, 2009.

Cleveland Indians
On June 24, 2009, Veras was acquired by the Cleveland Indians for cash considerations. On August 5, 2009, he was designated for assignment, and on August 11, 2009, he was outrighted to AAA. He was called up again in September toward the end of the 2009 season. He was non-tendered by the Indians, making him a free agent.

Florida Marlins
On January 29, 2010, Veras signed a minor league contract with the Florida Marlins with an invite to spring training, and was added to their active roster on April 3. On April 14, Veras was designated for assignment to bring up Chris Leroux to take his spot. Veras was called up on June 25, 2010. James Houser was designated for assignment to make room.

Pittsburgh Pirates
On January 16, 2011, Veras signed a minor league contract with the Pittsburgh Pirates with an invitation to spring training worth $1 million plus incentives.

Milwaukee Brewers
On December 12, 2011, Veras was traded to the Milwaukee Brewers in exchange for Casey McGehee.

Houston Astros
On December 18, 2012, Veras signed a contract with the Houston Astros for to a one-year, $2 million contract and a 2014 option worth $3.25 million with a $150,000 buyout. He played with the Dominican Republic in the 2013 World Baseball Classic.

Detroit Tigers
On July 29, 2013, Veras was traded to the Detroit Tigers in exchange for Danry Vasquez and a player to be named later. He gave up the game winning grand slam home run to Shane Victorino of the Red Sox in Game 6 of the 2013 American League Championship Series.  At the conclusion of the season, the Tigers declined Veras' club option for 2014.

Chicago Cubs
On December 27, 2013, Veras agreed to a one-year contract with the Chicago Cubs for the 2014 season worth $3.85 million with a club option for 2015.

Veras suffered extreme struggles early in the 2014 season, blowing 2 saves and allowing 10 earned runs in his first 6 appearances. Veras would then land on the disabled list, and quickly lose the closer role to fellow Cubs reliever Héctor Rondón. On June 3, he was designated for assignment. On June 10, the Cubs officially released Veras.

Second stint with the Astros
On June 15, 2014, Veras signed a minor league deal to return to the Astros. He was called up to the major league squad on June 26.

Atlanta Braves
On February 10, 2015, Veras signed a minor league deal with the Atlanta Braves.  Veras was released by the Braves on March 19, 2015.

Third stint with the Astros
On May 15, 2015, Veras signed a minor league deal to return to the Astros.  He was released on August 7, 2015.

Bridgeport Bluefish
On June 20, 2016, Veras signed with the Bridgeport Bluefish of the Atlantic League of Professional Baseball. This marks the first time Veras has ever pitched in independent baseball. He became a free agent after the 2016 season.

Pitching style
He has a mid to high 90s mph 4-seam fastball and a mid 80s changeup. Both pitches generate an above average number of ground balls. Veras also throws a mid 70s curveball, which is his top swing and miss pitch. He throws with a low 3/4 arm motion.

Family
Veras is married to Gissel Veras. They have a daughter, Gijen, and two sons, Genson and Hansel.

References

External links

1980 births
Living people
Bakersfield Blaze players
Bridgeport Bluefish players
Charleston RiverDogs players
Chicago Cubs players
Cleveland Indians players
Columbus Clippers players
Detroit Tigers players
Dominican Republic expatriate baseball players in the United States
Durham Bulls players
Florida Marlins players
Gulf Coast Devil Rays players
Gulf Coast Yankees players
Houston Astros players
Hudson Valley Renegades players

Major League Baseball pitchers
Major League Baseball players from the Dominican Republic
Milwaukee Brewers players
Montgomery Biscuits players
New Orleans Zephyrs players
New York Yankees players
Oklahoma City RedHawks players
Oklahoma RedHawks players
Orlando Rays players
Pittsburgh Pirates players
Princeton Devil Rays players
Scranton/Wilkes-Barre Yankees players
Tampa Yankees players
Tennessee Smokies players
World Baseball Classic players of the Dominican Republic
2013 World Baseball Classic players